Toivo Pohjala (1 February 1888 – 23 August 1969) was a Finnish wrestler and harness racing driver.

Wrestling 
Pohjala competed at the 1924 Summer Olympics, where he placed 7th in freestyle heavyweight event. He won a bronze medal in the heavyweight class at the 1922 World Wrestling Championships.

Harness racing 
As a harness racer Pohjala won two Racing King titles with his Finnhorse stallion "Lohdutus" in 1938 Vyborg and 1939 Turku. He was also the president of Finnish Trotting Association from 1955 to 1962.

Family 
His son Toivo T. Pohjala (1931–2018) was a former member of Finnish Parliament who served as the Minister of Agriculture and Forestry in 1987–1991.

References

1888 births
1969 deaths
People from Nakkila
People from Turku and Pori Province (Grand Duchy of Finland)
Olympic wrestlers of Finland
Wrestlers at the 1924 Summer Olympics
Finnish male sport wrestlers
Finnish harness racers
Sportspeople from Satakunta
World Wrestling Championships medalists